Ricardo Alessandro Severo is a Brazilian football manager.

Career
Born in Curitiba, Paraná, Severo began his career with the youth categories of hometown side Atlético Paranaense. He subsequently worked at J. Malucelli and Metropolitano before being named Gelson Silva's assistant at Brusque in 2004.

Severo worked with Silva at Marcílio Dias, Grêmio Barueri, Criciúma, Gama, Mogi Mirim and Joinville before returning to youth coaching in 2010, with the under-15 squad of Santos. He then worked as an under-15 manager at Palmeiras, Corinthians and Ituano, being named at the helm of the latter's under-20s in 2017. He was also in charge of Oeste's under-20 team during the most of the 2019 season, but was dismissed and subsequently moved abroad to Portuguese side Vilafranquense in the following year.

On 8 November 2020, Severo was appointed manager of Sport Recife's under-20 squad. He was also an interim manager of the main squad for the first match of the 2021 Campeonato Pernambucano, as the first team was still involved in the latter stages of the 2020 Campeonato Brasileiro Série A.

On 28 August 2021, Severo was again interim manager of the main squad in a 0–0 Série A home draw against Chapecoense, as new manager Gustavo Florentín was not in charge of the side.

References

External links

Living people
Sportspeople from Curitiba
Brazilian football managers
Campeonato Brasileiro Série A managers
Sport Club do Recife managers
Santos FC non-playing staff
Brazilian expatriate football managers
Brazilian expatriate sportspeople in Portugal
Expatriate football managers in Portugal
Year of birth missing (living people)